Jasper is the surname of:

People
 Chris Jasper (born 1951), American musician and former member of the Isley Brothers
 David Jasper (born 1951), Scottish theologian
 Derrick Jasper (born 1988), American former college basketball player
 Dick Jasper, 1950s American drag racer
 Ed Jasper (born 1973), American former National Football League player
 Heinrich Jasper (1875–1945), German politician
 Herbert Jasper (1906–1999), Canadian psychologist, physiologist, anatomist, chemist and neurologist
 Hi Jasper (1886–1937), Major League Baseball pitcher
 Inez Jasper (born 1981), Canadian singer-songwriter
 James M. Jasper (born 1957), American writer and sociologist
 John Jasper (1812–1901), American ex-slave, Baptist preacher and public speaker
 Josh Jasper (born 1987), All-American college football placekicker
 Ken Jasper (born 1938), Australian politician
 Kenji Jasper, writer
 Lee Jasper (born 1958), British race equality campaigner
 Michael Jasper (born 1986), American former National Football League player
 Paul Jasper (born 1974), American former race car driver
 Paul G. Jasper (1908–2001), Justice of the Indiana Supreme Court
 Sam Jasper (born 1986), New Zealand footballer
 Shawn Jasper (born 1959), American politician
 Star Jasper (born 1966), American actress
 Theodore Jasper (1814–1897), portrait painter and photographic colorist
 Thomas Chilton Jasper (1844–1924), American Civil War Confederate general
 William Jasper (c. 1750–1779), American Revolutionary War sergeant

Fictional characters
 John Jasper, protagonist of The Mystery of Edwin Drood, Charles Dickens' unfinished last novel

See also
 Jaspers (disambiguation), another surname